Myosin light chain, phosphorylatable, fast skeletal muscle is a protein that in humans is encoded by the MYLPF gene. It is located on chromosome 16 in humans. Myosin light chain, phosphorylatable

References

Further reading 

 
 
 
 

EF-hand-containing proteins